Gaëlle Nayo-Ketchanke (born 20 April 1988) is a French weightlifter. She holds six French records. She is a 4 time silver medalist at the European Championships (2015, 2016, 2018 and 2021) at the women's 75 kg and 81 kg events. In April 2019 she suffered a serious injury at the European Championships, breaking her arm in two places while attempting to snatch 107 kg. After just 5 months, she returned to competition at the World Championships in Pattaya.

In 2021, she competed in the women's 87 kg event at the 2020 Summer Olympics in Tokyo, Japan.

Major results

References

External links
 

1988 births
Living people
French female weightlifters
Cameroonian female weightlifters
Commonwealth Games competitors for Cameroon
Weightlifters at the 2006 Commonwealth Games
Cameroonian emigrants to France
Naturalized citizens of France
Weightlifters at the 2016 Summer Olympics
Olympic weightlifters of France
World Weightlifting Championships medalists
Mediterranean Games silver medalists for France
Mediterranean Games medalists in weightlifting
Competitors at the 2018 Mediterranean Games
European Weightlifting Championships medalists
Competitors at the 2007 All-Africa Games
African Games competitors for Cameroon
Weightlifters at the 2020 Summer Olympics
Sportspeople from Douala